Mureșanu is a Romanian language surname. Notable people with the surname include:

Andrei Mureșanu (1816–1863), Romanian poet and revolutionary
Camil Mureşanu (1927–2015), Romanian historian and professor
Tănase Mureșanu (1940–2007), Romanian fencer

See also
Andrei Mureșanu, Cluj-Napoca
Andrei Mureşanu National College
Andrei Mureşanu High School
Mureșan

Romanian-language surnames